The manga series  and its anime and live-action film adaptations have had various soundtracks and compilations released around them. The music for the series draws from jazz music of the early- to mid-20th century, and prominently features American jazz artists such as Art Blakey and Bill Evans.

The soundtrack for the anime series is composed primarily by Yoko Kanno, who won Best Music at the Tokyo Anime Awards for her work on Kids on the Slope in 2013. The anime series uses two pieces of theme music: its opening theme "" is performed by Yuki, while its closing theme "" is written and performed by Motohiro Hata.

Compilation albums

Kids on the Slope Original Soundtrack (2009)
In 2009, EMI Music Japan published Kids on the Slope Original Soundtrack, a compilation album collecting songs referenced in the manga series. The album is composed of a combination of licensed original recordings, and cover versions by the Japanese jazz quartet Quasimode. The album peaked at 261 on the Oricon sales charts.

Singles

"Sakamichi no Melody"
"" by  Yuki is the theme song used in the anime adaptation of the series. The song is composed and arranged by Yoko Kanno, and written by Yuki. The song was released as the B-side to her single "Playball" on May 2, 2012, and peaked at 4 on the Billboard Japan Hot 100 and 3 on the Oricon sales charts, where it remained for 11 weeks.

"Altair"
"" by Motohiro Hata is the closing theme for the anime adaptation of the series. The song peaked at 17 on the Oricon sales charts, and remained on the chart for 5 weeks.

Soundtrack albums

Kids on the Slope Original Soundtrack (2012)
In 2012, Epic Records Japan published Kids on the Slope Original Soundtrack, which collects songs used in the anime adaption of the series and Yoko Kanno's original score. The album peaked at 39 on the Oricon sales charts, and remained on the chart for 16 weeks.

Kids on the Slope Original Soundtrack: Plus More & Rare
Kids on the Slope Original Soundtrack: Plus More & Rare, a supplement to Kids on the Slope Original Soundtrack (2012) featuring additional and rearranged music from the anime series, was also published by Epic Records Japan in 2012. The album peaked at 49 on the Oricon sales charts.

Kids on the Slope Soundtrack & Jazz Music Collection
In 2018, Ariola Japan published Kids on the Slope Soundtrack & Jazz Music Collection, which collects the soundtrack of the live-action film adaptation of the series. The album peaked at 161 on the Oricon sales charts.

All songs are composed by Masato Suzuki of the band .

References

Further reading
 Hamilton, Kirk. "A Listener's Guide to the Music of Kids on the Slope" (Kotaku, May 2012). Listing and breakdown of the jazz songs used in the anime series.

Anime soundtracks